Prchal (feminine: Prchalová) is a Czech surname. It may refer to:

Bolek Prchal, Czech actor
Eduard Prchal (1911-1984), Czech pilot
Josef Prchal (1925-1989), Czech Communist politician
Radim Prchal, Czech hockey player and referee

See also
Prchala

Czech-language surnames